Martinček is a village and municipality in Ružomberok District in the Žilina Region of northern Slovakia.

History
In historical records the village was first mentioned in 1250.

Geography
The municipality lies at an altitude of 598 metres and covers an area of 2.476 km². It has a population of about 383 people.

External links
https://web.archive.org/web/20080111223415/http://www.statistics.sk/mosmis/eng/run.html 

Villages and municipalities in Ružomberok District